Carl Strandlund (5 March 1899 – 26 December 1974) was a Swedish-born American inventor and entrepreneur.

Background
Carl Gunnar Strandlund  was born in Sundsvall in Västernorrland County, Sweden. Strandlund came to the United States at the age of four and grew up in Moline, Illinois. As a young man, he took correspondence school classes in engineering. His grandfather had been an engineer in Sweden. His father worked in the United States for John Deere.

Career
Strandlund held over 150 farm implement patents through his work as a production engineer at the Minneapolis-Moline tractor company, including the creation of rubber tires for tractors. He later served as president of the Oliver Farm Equipment Company.

He was hired by the Chicago Vitreous Enamel Product Company  to transform the factory for defense production. Strandlund invented manufacturing techniques to build non-warping metal plates for tanks during World War II, created air conditioning systems for movie theaters, and invented a wallpaper-removing machine. The company rewarded him with a promotion to vice president and general manager in September 1943.

Strandlund was most noted for inventing and promoting the Lustron house (built of porcelain-enameled steel panels - ) to help address the housing shortage after World War II. 2498 homes were built 1948–1950 at a large assembly plant in Columbus, Ohio, through financing from the Reconstruction Finance Corporation. The Lustron plant assembly line was some 9 miles long and the plant consumed more power than the rest of the entire city of Columbus. Mismanagement, politics, and corruption were blamed for the downfall of Lustron, which shut down amid foreclosure and bankruptcy in 1953. As of 2004, the majority of the 2,498 Lustron homes built were still standing. Fifty Lustrons have been placed on the National Register of Historic Places.

In a September 12, 1982, Minneapolis Tribune article, Strandlund's widow Clara related how Strandlund reacted to the closure of Lustron: "He was physically and mentally destroyed," she said. "Everything we had went. They took everything but our home."  He died in Edina, a suburb of Minneapolis, at the age of 75. Strandlund is interred next to his wife Clara at Lakewood Cemetery, Minneapolis, MN.

References

External links
Lustron Preservation

1899 births
1974 deaths
Swedish emigrants to the United States
20th-century American inventors